The women's road race at the 2022 Commonwealth Games in Birmingham, England was held on 7 August.

Schedule
The schedule was as follows:

All times are British Summer Time (UTC+1)

Results
The results were as follows:

References

Women's road race
2022 in women's road cycling
Road cycling at the Commonwealth Games